Frederick Nels Vant Hull (August 21, 1920 – April 10, 1975) was an American football player. He played 8 games for the Green Bay Packers during the 1942 season.

Vant Hull was born in Winnipeg, Manitoba, Canada. He contracted polio and was subsequently paralyzed, requiring a wheelchair as an assistive device, in the 1952-1955 time frame.  At that time he was an announcer for KEYD, an AM station in Minneapolis. He died in  1975.

References

External links
NFL.com
 Milwaukee Sentinel 

1920 births
Canadian players of American football
Green Bay Packers players
Sportspeople from Winnipeg
University of Minnesota alumni
Minnesota Golden Gophers football players
1975 deaths
Gridiron football people from Manitoba